The Pan American Women's Club Handball Championship, organized by the Pan-American Team Handball Federation, is the official competition for women's handball clubs of Americas  crowning the Pan American champions.

Summary 

Source:

Medal table

Per Club

Per Nation

References

External links
 www.panamhandball.org

 
Handball
Pan-American Team Handball Federation competitions
Women's handball competitions
Recurring sporting events established in 2016